Pati, Barwani is a village & Tehsil in Barwani district in the Indian state of Madhya Pradesh. In 2014, Pati was selected by Ministry of Tribal Affairs among 10 tribal blocks in the country, to introduce tribal welfare scheme known as Van Bandhu Kalyan Yojana launched by Arun Jaitley, cabinet minister with Government of India.

Geography
Pati is located in the Narmada Valley
It has an average elevation of 246 metres (810 feet).
Pati lies 23 km from Barwani & is a Tehsil of Barwani district.

References

External links
 Barwani District
 Ministry of Tribal Affairs

Cities and towns in Barwani district
Barwani